Clarence Center can refer to:
Clarence Center, New York
Clarence Center, Michigan